Hermine Waterneau or Waternau (1862 - 1916) was a French painter.

She was the daughter of Louis Aimé Waternau, French colonel commander of the Légion d'honneur after the Battle of Wörth, who died in 1879  . She became a pupil of Delphine Arnould de Cool-Fortin and showed work at the Paris Salon from 1878 when she showed a portrait of her father. Her work By the Bank of a Stream was included in the book Women Painters of the World.

She died of a heart attack together with her maid Ermunde Serre, and their bodies were discovered by authorities when neighbors were alarmed by their absence.

References

External links

1862 births
1916 deaths
19th-century French painters
French women painters
19th-century French women artists